Rubén Eduardo Rodríguez-Peña Llantén is a Chilean former footballer who played as a forward. Besides Chile, he played in Costa Rica, Honduras and Ecuador.

Career
In his homeland, Rodríguez-Peña played for Magallanes, Green Cross, Huachipato and Deportes La Serena in the top division from 1966 to 1972.

In 1973, he moved abroad and played for Costa Rican side Herediano.

From 1974 to 1978, he played in the Honduran top level for Platense in two stints and Real España. A well remembered player of Platense, he made forty-eight appearances and scored twenty-one goals from 1974 to 1975 and holds the record of scoring in eight consecutive matchdays in 1974, becoming the top goalscorer in the 1974–75 season with fifteen goals. He returned to Platense in 1978, making two appearances, after playing for Real España from 1975 to 1977, with thirty appearances and six goals, with whom he won three consecutive league titles. He also played for Ecuadorian side Club Deportivo 2 de Marzo alongside his brother, Waldo.

Honours

Club
Real España
 Liga Nacional de Fútbol Profesional (3): 1974–75, 1975–76, 1976–77

Individual
 Liga Nacional de Fútbol Profesional Top Goalscorer: 1974–75

References

External links
 

Living people
Footballers from Santiago
Chilean footballers
Chilean expatriate footballers
Chilean Primera División players
Deportes Magallanes footballers
Magallanes footballers
Club de Deportes Green Cross footballers
C.D. Huachipato footballers
Deportes La Serena footballers
Liga FPD players
C.S. Herediano footballers
Liga Nacional de Fútbol Profesional de Honduras players
Platense F.C. players
Real C.D. España players
Chilean expatriate sportspeople in Costa Rica
Chilean expatriate sportspeople in Honduras
Chilean expatriate sportspeople in Ecuador
Expatriate footballers in Costa Rica
Expatriate footballers in Honduras
Expatriate footballers in Ecuador
Association football forwards
Date of birth missing (living people)